The Marsh Botanical Garden is a botanical garden and arboretum located on the Yale University campus at 265 Mansfield Street in New Haven, Connecticut, United States.

History
The Garden was established in 1899 when paleontologist Othniel Charles Marsh, an 1860 Yale College graduate, bequeathed his estate and plant collections to the university. The Garden was designed by landscape architect Beatrix Farrand during the 1920s and 1930s as part of her design for the Yale campus.

Today, the Garden supports research and instruction, and is a public greenspace. Only remnants of Farrand's design remain, although restoration work has begun. The greenhouses contain collections of cacti, insectivores, and orchids.

Directors
James William Toumey
George Elwood Nichols (1926–1939)
Edmund Ware Sinnott (1940–1950)
Oswald Tippo (1955–1960)
Bruce Bernot Stowe
Steven Handel (1979–1985)
Mary Helen Goldsmith (1985–2002)
Timothy Nelson (2002–2015)
Michael Donoghue (2015–2018)
Erika Edwards (2018–present)

See also
 List of botanical gardens in the United States

References

External links
 Official site

Geography of New Haven, Connecticut
Arboreta in Connecticut
Botanical gardens in Connecticut
Yale University
Protected areas of New Haven County, Connecticut
Tourist attractions in New Haven, Connecticut